Silver Run is an unincorporated community in Meigs County, in the U.S. state of Ohio.

History
A post office called Silver Run was established in 1850. Silver Run is also the name of a nearby stream.

References

Unincorporated communities in Meigs County, Ohio
Unincorporated communities in Ohio